Zombies 3 is a 2022 American science fiction musical film that premiered on Disney+ on July 15, 2022 and Disney Channel on August 12, 2022. A sequel to the 2018 film Zombies and the 2020 film Zombies 2, it stars Milo Manheim and Meg Donnelly reprising their lead roles as Zed and Addison, respectively. Much of the main supporting cast from the first two Zombies films also return. The film follows the town of Seabrook, which now hosts zombies, normal humans, and werewolves all coexisting in harmony, as they attempt to repel an alien invasion.

Plot 
In the town of Seabrook, werewolves, humans and zombies live in peace. It's their last year at Seabrook High (their high school) and Addison has been accepted into Mountain College. Zed is pursuing an athletic scholarship at Mountain College and is hoping to join Addison in her college. During the night before a highly anticipated football game, where, should they win, Seabrook's going to have their first zombie/monster recruited into college, therefore bringing down a barrier for all other monsters, a UFO arrives and causes mass panic. Its alien passengers and 3 alien leader's called "A-Lan, A-Li and A-Spen".They arrived in search of an interstellar map to Utopia (their previous home was destroyed), a perfect new home for their species. To cover up their real purpose, they claim to be here to compete in the National Cheer Off, which Addison previously had organized. While being interrogated by the Z-Patrol, A-Spen finds a loophole so Zed can get into college by having an exceptional scholarship by improving his grades.

Willa, Wyatt and Wynter are extremely distrustful of the aliens, they think they are there to take what is theirs. The aliens settle into Seabrook temporarily. The aliens interrogate the werewolves and scan their minds with their Luma Lenses. Eliza, who is currently interning at Z-Corp, the maker of the Z-bands, helps Zed with his scholarship. However, the aliens beat Zed's records, both athletic and academic, lowering his chances of entering college. Zed, in return for the aliens altering his report card, helps the aliens identify the moonstone, which they scan for coordinates and discover is lethal to them. A-Spen meets Addison, whom they reveal to that they are in love with Zed. At cheer practice, the cheer team is threatened after witnessing the aliens practice. The aliens are almost caught by the werewolves and head to their Mothership where Zed helps them with his knowledge of Seabrook, whereas Addison is mistakenly beamed up to the Mothership. A-Spen, A-Li and A-Lan reveal their true reasons for arriving in Seabrook. After fixing and watching the Scout's logs, they discover that the scout is none other than Addison's maternal grandmother, Angie. (Bucky, Addison's cousin, is not related to Angie, as he is related to Addison on her father's side.)

Zed is nervous for his home college interview, which is the last thing he needs to overcome before figuring out if he is accepted in Mountain College or not. Addison's alien powers cause him to "zombie out" during his interview, causing his interviewer, Ms. Crabtree, to leave. Addison questions her identity as an alien, asking her mom about her grandma. The trio of aliens suspect that the Seabrook Cup, which is the trophy Angie created, now awarded to the winning team of the Cheer Off, which is crafted with materials from their home world, is their map home. Addison discovers this same thing soon after and realizes either the aliens win it or she does. The werewolves discover the aliens' mission and alert the Z-Patrol. Zed, after learning he was accepted into college, discovers the Z-Patrol's orders and tries to stop the aliens from competing in the Cheer-Off. The extraterrestrial team is disqualified, leaving Addison being their only chance of finding Utopia. The Seabrook Mighty Shrimp are victorious at the competition and win.

The werewolves crash into the cheer pavilion and reveal the aliens' plans. The aliens, Addison and Zed escape before Addison reveals to the town her alien heritage. Zed reveals his college news and the aliens realize that the coordinates to Utopia lie in Addison's DNA. Unfortunately, their map is dynamic, meaning they must take Addison to their new home. A conflicted Addison agrees to go. Zed offers to go with her, but it's impossible as he would be killed by their stardust energy within minutes. The day the aliens and Addison are set to leave for Utopia, the aliens' ship is critically damaged, so the werewolves offer their moonstone and Eliza states that they could charge the ship by filtering the moonstone's energy through their Z-Bands. Zed risks his life by interfering with the power of the aliens and the moonstone, though he survives. As the others race to exit the ship before it releases into space, Addison and Zed share one last kiss before he is beamed back to Earth and the spaceship disappears into hyperspace.

A few days later, in a world without Addison, the group celebrates their graduation as the aliens decrypt Addison's DNA as the map coordinates. Addison realizes that her grandma Angie wanted her species to live on Earth, just as the map is decoded into revealing that Earth was Utopia the entire time, confirming Addison's beliefs. The aliens then return to Seabrook, as a joyful Zed, Bree, Willa, Wynter, Wyatt, Bonzo, Bucky and the Aceys celebrate their return. Afterwards, the aliens fully move in to Seabrook, along with several other monsters and creatures including vampires and merfolk.

During the credits, Bucky is shown boarding Mothership and activating it for launch, aiming to "bring cheer to the farthest reaches of the galaxy".

Cast 
 Milo Manheim as Zed
 Meg Donnelly as Addison
 Trevor Tordjman as Bucky
 Kylee Russell as Eliza
 Carla Jeffery as Bree
 Chandler Kinney as Willa
 Pearce Joza as Wyatt
 Baby Ariel as Wynter
 Terry Hu as A-Spen
 Matt Cornett as A-Lan
 Kyra Tantao as A-Li
 Kingston Foster as Zoey
 James Godfrey as Bonzo
 RuPaul as the voice of the Mothership
 Emilia McCarthy as Lacey 
 Noah Zulfikar as Jacey 
 Jasmine Renée Thomas as Stacey 
 Naomi Snieckus as Principal Lee 
 Paul Hopkins as Dale 
 Marie Ward as Missy 
 Sheila McCarthy as Angie 
 Jonathan Langdon as Coach 
 Tony Nappo as Zevon

Production 
On March 22, 2021, a third film, titled Zombies 3, was announced, with filming set to take place in the spring in Toronto, Canada. Milo Manheim and Meg Donnelly reprised their respective roles of Zed and Addison. Paul Hoen served as the director, while Bloor Street Productions served as the production company. David Light, Joseph Raso, Suzanne Farwell, and Resonate Entertainment served as executive producers. On May 19, 2021, it was announced that Matt Cornett, Kyra Tantao, Terry Hu were cast in the film in the respective roles of A-Lan, A-Li, and A-Spen. Chandler Kinney, Pearce Joza, Baby Ariel, Trevor Tordjman, Carla Jeffery, Kylee Russell, James Godfrey, and Kingston Foster also returned in their respective roles. Production on the film began on May 31, 2021 and wrapped in July 2021. On May 20, 2022, RuPaul was announced to have joined the cast as the voice of "The Mothership", described in the official synopsis as "a comedically passive-aggressive UFO".

Due to her pregnancy, Kylee Russell was unable to film with the rest of the cast; her scenes were accomplished through only showing her torso-up in shots and interacts with the rest of the cast through a robot body.

Release 
Zombies 3 was released on July 15, 2022, on Disney+. The movie also aired on Disney Channel on August 12, billed as a "Lost Song edition". The scene where A-spen reveals to Addison that they are in love with Zed, Bree, Addison, Willa, Wynter and A-spen sing about the feeling of being in love, the song being titled as "What Is This Feeling?"

Reception

Audience viewership 
According to Whip Media, Zombies 3 was the 4th most watched film across all platforms in the United States, during the week of July 15, 2022. According to Nielsen, Zombies 3 was the 7th most watched film across all platforms, during the week of July 17, 2022.

Critical reception 
On the review aggregator website Rotten Tomatoes, 75% of 8 critics' reviews are positive, with an average rating of 6.30/10.

Sourav Chakraborty of Sportskeeda found Zombies 3 to be a solid finale in the Zombies franchise, praised the movie for its depiction of love, acceptance, and equality, applauded the soundtrack of the film across its songs and the chemistry between the characters, and complimented the premise involving extraterrestrial characters. John Serba of Decider praised the music and the choreography, stating the songs manage to be appealing, and complimented the film's message dealing with acceptance and inclusion, while finding the movie colorful, garish, and sometimes nonsensical. Jennifer Green of Common Sense Media rated the film 3 ouf of 5 stars, praised the presence of positive messages and role models, citing diversity, equality, and inclusion, and complimented the diverse representations.

Lena Wilson of The New York Times wrote that the film is much more than "90 minutes of silliness" and praised its tone, but criticized how Zombies 3 portrayed socio-cultural differences, specifically Terry Hu's queer character. Brian Lowry of CNN found the film energic and progressive, but wrote that the film was "dead on arrival" and "hard to get fired up for," voicing concern at the use of aliens (which he found clichéd) after the first two films had depicted zombies and werewolves, and found the songs to be of mediocre quality, except "I'm Finally Me" and the reprise of "Someday."

Accolades 
The film received a nomination for Outstanding Kids and Family Programming - Live Action at the 34th GLAAD Media Awards. It received a nomination for Excellence in Crafts - Illustrations at the 2023 CAFTCAD Awards.

Future 
Disney has neither confirmed nor denied a fourth feature-length Zombies installment, and sources conflict on whether a fourth film is likely to be made. Manheim has stated that Zombies 3 "does a very good job at wrapping up [the Zombies franchise]", though he also left open the possibility of a fourth film, and believes the decision to produce Zombies 4 depends on the reception of Zombies 3 and "if the stars align".

Disney has announced, however, that an animated series titled ZOMBIES: The Re-Animated Series is currently in production.

Notes

References

External links 
 

2020s English-language films
2020s monster movies
2020s musical comedy films
2020s teen comedy films
2022 films
2022 television films
American dance films
American teen musical films
American werewolf films
American zombie films
Cheerleading films
Disney+ original films
Disney Channel Original Movie films
Films about extraterrestrial life
Films directed by Paul Hoen
Films scored by George S. Clinton
Human-zombie romance in fiction
Musical television films
2020s American films